So Simple may refer to:

 "So Simple", a song by Alicia Keys from her 2003 album The Diary of Alicia Keys
 "So Simple", a song by Stacie Orrico from her 2006 album Beautiful Awakening